Bijele Vode  is a village in central Croatia, in the municipality of Glina, Sisak-Moslavina County.

Demographics
According to the 2011 census, the village of Bijele Vode has 67 inhabitants. This represents 18.06% of its pre-war population according to the 1991 census.

Population by ethnicity

References

External links

Populated places in Sisak-Moslavina County
Serb communities in Croatia
Glina, Croatia